The G protein-coupled bile acid receptor 1 (GPBAR1) also known G-protein coupled receptor 19 (GPCR19), membrane-type receptor for bile acids (M-BAR) or TGR5 as is a protein that in humans is encoded by the GPBAR1 gene.

Function 

This gene encodes a member of the G protein-coupled receptor (GPCR) superfamily. This protein functions as a cell surface receptor for bile acids. Treatment of cells expressing this GPCR with bile acids induces the production of intracellular cAMP, activation of a MAP kinase signaling pathway, and internalization of the receptor. The receptor is implicated in the suppression of macrophage functions and regulation of energy homeostasis by bile acids.

One effect of this receptor is to activate deiodinases which convert the prohormone thyroxine (T4) to the active hormone triiodothyronine (T3).  T3 in turn activates the thyroid hormone receptor which increases metabolic rate.

References

Further reading

External links
 
 

G protein-coupled receptors